Hot rods are typically American cars that might be old, classic, or modern and that have been rebuilt or modified with large engines optimized for speed and acceleration. One definition is: "a car that's been stripped down, souped up and made to go much faster." However, there is no definition of the term that is universally accepted and the term is attached to a wide range of vehicles. Most often they are individually designed and constructed using components from many makes of old or new cars, and are most prevalent in the United States and Canada. Many are intended for exhibition rather than for racing or everyday driving.

The origin of the term "hot rod" is unclear. For example, some say that the term "hot" refers to the vehicle's being stolen. Other origin stories include replacing the engine's camshaft or "rod" with a higher performance version. According to the Hot Rod Industry Alliance (HRIA) the term changes in meaning over the years, but "hot rodding has less to do with the vehicle and more to do with an attitude and lifestyle." For example, hot rods were favorites for greasers.

The term has broadened to apply to other items that are modified for a particular purpose, such as "hot-rodded amplifier".

Etymology 
There are various theories about the origin of the term "hot rod". The common theme is that "hot" related to "hotting up" a car, which means modifying it for greater performance. One theory is that "rod" means roadster, a lightweight 2-door car which was often used as the basis for early hot rods. Another theory is that "rod" refers to camshaft, a part of the engine which was often upgraded in order to increase power output.

In the early days, a car modified for increased performance was called a "gow job". This term morphed into the hot rod in the early to middle 1950s.

The term "hot rod" has had various uses in relation to performance cars. For example, the Ontario Ministry of the Environment in its vehicle emissions regulations refers to a hot rod as any motorized vehicle that has a replacement engine differing from the factory original.

History

1920s to 1945 
The predecessors to the hotrod were the modified cars used in the Prohibition era by bootleggers to evade revenue agents and other law enforcement.

Hot rods first appeared in the late 1930s in southern California, where people raced modified cars on dry lake beds northeast of Los Angeles, under the rules of the Southern California Timing Association (SCTA), among other groups. This gained popularity after World War II, particularly in California, because many returning soldiers had received technical training. The first hot rods were old cars (most often Fords, typically 1910s-1920s Model Ts, 1928–31 Model As, or 1932-34 Model Bs), modified to reduce weight. Engine swaps often involved fitting the Ford flathead V8 engine (known as the "flatty") into a different car, for example, the common practice in the 1940s of installing the "60 horse" version into a Jeep chassis.

Typical modifications were removal of convertible tops, hoods, bumpers, windshields, and/or fenders; channeling the body; and modifying the engine by tuning and/or replacing with a more powerful type. Wheels and tires were changed for improved traction and handling. Hot rods built before 1945 commonly used '35 Ford wire-spoke wheels.

1945 to 1960 

After World War II, many small military airports throughout the country were either abandoned or rarely used, allowing hot rodders across the country to race on marked courses. As some hot rodders also raced on the street, a need arose for an organization to promote safety, and to provide venues for safe racing. The National Hot Rod Association was founded in 1951, to take drag racing off the streets and into controlled environments.

In the '50s and '60s, the Ford flathead V8 was supplanted by the Chrysler FirePower engine (known as the "early hemi"). Many hot rods would upgrade the brakes from mechanical to hydraulic ("juice") and headlights from bulb to sealed-beam. A typical mid-1950s to early 1960s custom Deuce was fenderless and steeply chopped, powered by a Ford or Mercury flathead, with an Edelbrock intake manifold, Harman and Collins magneto, and Halibrand quick-change differential. Front suspension hairpins were adapted from sprint cars, such as the Kurtis Krafts.

As hot rodding became more popular, magazines and associations catering to hot rodders were started, such as the magazine Hot Rod, founded in 1948.

1960 to present 

As automobiles offered by the major automakers began increasing performance, the lure of hot rods began to wane. With the advent of the muscle car, it was now possible to purchase a high-performance car straight from the showroom.

However, the 1973 Oil Crisis caused car manufacturers to focus on fuel efficiency over performance, which led to a resurgence of interest in hot rodding. As the focus shifted away from racing, the modified cars became known as "street rods". The National Street Rod Association (NSRA) was formed and began hosting events.

By the 1970s, the  small-block Chevy V8 was the most common choice of engine for hot rods. Another popular engine choice is the Ford Windsor engine. During the 1980s, many car manufacturers were reducing the displacements of their engines, thus making it harder for hot rod builders to obtain large displacement engines. Instead, engine builders had to modify the smaller engines (such as using non-standard crankshafts and pistons) to obtain larger displacement. While current production V8s tended to be the most frequent candidates, this also applied to others. In the mid-1980s, as stock engine sizes diminished, rodders discovered the  aluminum-block Buick or Oldsmobile V8 could be modified for substantially greater displacement, with mainly wrecking yard parts. This trend was not limited to American cars; Volkswagen enthusiasts similarly stretched stock 1600cc engines to over two liters.

In modern culture

There is still a vibrant hot rod culture worldwide, especially in Canada, the United States, the United Kingdom, Australia and Sweden. The hot rod community has now been subdivided into two main groups: street rodders and hot rodders.

Lifestyle

There is a contemporary movement of traditional hot rod builders, car clubs and artists who have returned to the roots of hot rodding as a lifestyle. This includes a new breed of traditional hot rod builders, artists, and styles, as well as classic style car clubs. Events like GreaseOrama feature traditional hot rods and the greaser lifestyle. Magazines like Ol' Skool Rodz, Gears and Gals, and Rat-Rods and Rust Queens cover events and people.

In popular culture

Author Tom Wolfe was one of the first to recognize the importance of hot rodding in popular culture and brought it to mainstream attention in his book The Kandy-Kolored Tangerine-Flake Streamline Baby.

There are magazines that feature traditional hot rods, including Hot Rod, Car Craft, Rod and Custom, and Popular Hot Rodding. There are also television shows such as My Classic Car, Horsepower TV, American Hot Rod, Fast and Loud, and Chop Cut Rebuild.

Particularly during the early 1960s, a genre of "hot rod music" rose to mainstream popularity. Hot rod music was largely a product of a number of surf music groups running out of ideas for new surfing songs and simultaneously shifting their lyrical focus toward hot rods. Hot rod music would prove to be the second phase in a progression known as the California Sound, which would mature into more complex topics as the decade passed. Hot rods were used as the theme of Lightning Rod, a Rocky Mountain Construction roller coaster at Dollywood.

In Sweden and Finland

Locals in these countries, influenced by American culture, have created a local hot rod culture which is vibrant in Sweden and Finland where enthusiasts gather at meetings such as Power Big Meet and clubs like Wheels and Wings in Varberg, Sweden have established themselves in Hot Rod culture. Since there is very little "vintage tin" the hot rods in Sweden are generally made with a home made chassis (usually a Model T or A replica), with a Jaguar (or Volvo 240) rear axle, a small-block V8, and fiberglass tub, but some have been built using for instance a Volvo Duett chassis. Because the Swedish regulations required a crash test even for custom-built passenger cars between 1969 and 1982, the Duett option was preferred, since it was considered a rebodied Duett rather than a new vehicle. Some 1950s and 1960s cars are also hot rodded, like Morris Minor, Ford Anglia, Volvo Amazon, Ford Cortina, '57 Chevy, to name but a few. These are known as custom cars (sometimes spelled Kustom).

Language
Certain linguistic conventions are common among rodders:
The model year is rarely given in full, except when it might be confused, so a 1934 model is a '34, while a 2005 might be an '05 or not.
A '32 is usually a Deuce and most often a roadster, unless coupé is specified, and almost always a Ford.
A 3- or 5-window is usually a Ford unless specified.
A flatty is a flathead V8 (always Ford, unless specified); a late (or late model) flatty is probably a Merc.
A hemi ("hem ee") is always a 426, unless displacement (331, 354, or 392) is specified; a 426 is a hemi, unless Wedge is specified.
A 392 is an early hemi.
A 331 or 354 is known to be an (early) Hemi, but rarely referred to as such
Units are routinely dropped, unless they are unclear, so a 426 cubic inch (in³) engine is simply referred to as a 426, a 5-liter engine is a 5.0 ("five point oh"), and a 600 cubic feet per minute (cfm) carburetor is a 600. Engine displacement can be described in cubic inches or liters (for example, a 5.7-liter engine is also known as a 350 {"three fifty"}); this frequently depends on which units the user is most comfortable or familiar with.

Common terms
1/2-race — mild flatty cam, suitable for enthusiastic street or highway use. It was halfway in performance between a full race cam and a stock cam. 
3/4-race — high-performance flatty cam, suitable for street and strip use. These cams were half way in performance between a full race cam and a 1/2 race cam.
3 deuces — arrangement of three 2-barrel (twin-choke) carburetors; distinct from Six Pak and Pontiac and Olds Tri-Power (also 3x2 arrangements)
3-window — 2-door coupé; so named for one door window on each side plus the rear window
5-window — 2-door coupé; so named for one door window and one quarter window on each side plus the rear window
97s  (“ninety-sevens”) — reference to particular Stromberg carburetors
A-bone — Model A coupé
Alky — alcohol (methanol) racing fuel
Altered — drag racing car, or the category it runs in
Anglebox - British slang for a '59 to '68 Anglia
Ardun — Hemi heads for the flathead, designed by Zora Duntov
Awful Awful (mainly North American) — AA/FA ("double A" Fuel Altered) racing car
Back-halved - a bodied drag racing car that has had its stock rear suspension removed and replaced with a four-link or ladder bar rear suspension, and narrowed rear axle. This arrangement allows for larger tires and better adjustability.
Bagged - the use of air suspension to raise and lower the car
Bench race (or bench racing) - discussion of racing, or of a car's performance
Big tire - a drag racing car running large rear tires usually over 29" tall and wider than 10.5"
Blower — mechanically driven supercharger; excludes turbochargers. Commonly a Roots.
Blown
An engine equipped with a supercharger (a "blown hemi"); rarely used in reference to turbocharged engines
A vehicle equipped with a supercharged engine (a "blown higboy")
A wrecked engine or transmission
Blue oval — Ford product (for the badge)
Blueprint - to assemble something (usually an engine) to precise specifications or with special care
Blueprinting - to blueprint 
Bondo — the brand name for a body filler putty, often used as a generic term for any such product
Bored — increased the diameter of the cylinders in order to increase engine displacement ("He bored the engine"); having had the diameter increased ("the engine was bored")
Bottle — nitrous tank
Bowtie — Chevrolet product (for the badge)
Boosted — a car that has a turbocharger or supercharger
Bugcatcher (or bugcatcher intake) — large scoop intake protruding through hood opening, or on cars with no hood.
Bulletproof - assembled in a fail-proof manner
Bump in — the act of staging a drag car by moving forward in short increments or "bumps" while a transbrake or light foot brake pressure is applied. A transbrake equipped car uses a "bump box" to momentarily unlock the transmission allowing it to creep short distances. This is often done by turbo cars in order to build boost pressure while staging, but can also be done by non-turbo cars to shallow stage to increase roll out.
Bumpstick — camshaft (for the lobes)
Burndown — intentionally slowly staging a car for a drag race in order to throw the other driver off his game, or to cause the opponent's car to build excess heat. Also called a staging duel.
Cam — camshaft
Cammer
(most commonly) the SOHC (single overhead camshaft) version of the 427 Ford V8.
(sometimes) the Ford Racing Power Parts 5-liter.
(rarely) any engine with overhead camshaft(s).
Channelled — a car lowered by having the floor removed and reattached; also, to have done so
Channeling — removing the floor and reattaching it to the body at a higher point, thus lowering the car without suspension modifications. Sometimes known as a "body drop".
Cheater slicks (also "cheaters") — soft compound tires with just enough tread added to make them street legal (not usually in singular)
Cherry — like new
Chipped — fitted with a modified ECU or PCM
Chop — removing a section of the roof pillars and windows to lower the roofline
Chopped — also "chopped top"; to have top chopped
Chopping — executing a top chop
C.I.D. (sometimes cubic inches or inches) — cubic inches displacement
COPO - Central Office Production Order
Crank — crankshaft
Cubes — CID
Cubic inches — CID
Cutout — a short leg of the exhaust system that exits to the side of the car and typically in front of the driver. The cutout can be operated manually or remotely from the driver's seat. Hot rodders typically use cutouts on hot rods that are used on the street and the strip. The cutout is closed for street use and open for drag racing on the strip.
Deuce  — '32 Ford Model B (most often a roadster); now commonly on A frame rails
Digger — dragster:  only applied to rails, slingshots, or fuel cars
Double-pumper - carburetor with mechanical primary and secondary jets
Dual quads — two four-barrel carburetors
Dragster
(broadly) any vehicle modified or purpose-built for use on strips.
(specifically) specialized racers (early or recent types, in gas, alky, or fuel varieties)
Door slammer (doorslammer, door car) — A drag racing car that retains its stock body with functioning doors or the appearance of a stock body with functioning doors. Some classes of door slammers are Pro Stock, Pro Modified, Real Street, x275, and Outlaw 10.5.
Dyno queen — a car that puts up impressive power numbers on a dynamometer but fails to perform well when actually raced. 
Elephant — Chrysler hemi
Fabricate - create a part no longer be available; create any part from scratch
Factory freak - an unmodified car that seemingly makes more power than or is much quicker than the average for its year, make, and model.
Fat-fender — 1934-48 (U.S.) car (Most common usage is to refer to '41-'48 inclusive, with '35-'41s called "pontoon fenders".)
Flager (street racing) —the person who stages and starts the race, usually by an arm drop or flashlight.
Flamed — painted with a flame job
Flatty — flathead engine (usually refers to a Ford; when specified, the Mercury-built model)
3/8s by 3/8s — lengthening the stroke and increasing the cylinder bore . A term only applied to flattys.
Four-barrel - carburetor with four venturis (chokes)
French — to install headlight or taillight slightly sunken into fender
Frenched — headlight or tallight slightly sunken into fender; to install as such ("she frenched the taillights")
Fuel
(most commonly) nitro (or a mixture of nitro and alky)
the top drag racing class (which runs on nitro)
(broadly) gasoline (petrol)
Fuelie
(originally) the 1957 Corvette fuel injected engine, or the car itself ("the fuellie 'vette")
(commonly now) any fuel injected engine
Fueler — any drag racing car run on nitro, or in a nitro class
Full-race — high-performance flatty cam, suitable only for strip use
Gasser — car used in gasoline-only drag racing classes in the 1960s (as opposed to alcohol or nitromethane fuels), where the front end of the car is raised along with the motor. Characterized by a body that sits well above the front wheels. Distinct from hiboy.
Gap — To win a race by at least a car length ("That GTO put the gap on that Mustang.")
Gennie — genuine
Giggle gas — nitrous oxide
Goat — Pontiac GTO
Grenaded — to break a part into pieces ("When I missed that shift it grenaded my transmission.")
Hair dryer — turbocharger (for the shape of the intake and exhaust casings)
Hairpins — radius rods on axle suspension systems
Hang (or pull) the laundry  — to deploy a braking parachute
Header — variety of exhaust manifold.
The hit — giving someone in a drag race the option to move first. Sometimes "the move".
Hopped up (also "hopped") — stock engine modified to increase performance (more common in the '40s and '50s)
Huffer — supercharger, especially of the Roots type.
Hydrogen Hot Rod — Hot Rrod powered by alternate fuel
Inches — CID
Indian (also "Tin Indian") — Pontiac (for the grille badge)
Jimmy 
(usually) GMC straight-6 engine
any GMC product, such as a compressor used on 2-stroke diesels used as a supercharger.
Jimmy Six — GMC straight 6
Juice 
nitro
nitrous oxide
Jug - carburetor (no longer common)
Juice brakes — hydraulic brakes
Kits — multiple nitrous oxide systems ("How many kits are you spraying?")
Lake pipes — exhaust pipes running beneath the rocker panels, after use by lakes racers.
Laundry - parachutes used to slow drag racing cars 
Lope — exhaust note produced by of a high-duration cam
Louvers — cuts in the sheet metal of the body with a narrow raised section on one side of the cuts to create a small opening. Used to release air from engine compartments, or often merely for aesthetics
Lowering — reducing the ride height (or ground clearance)
Lunched — wrecked; caused to be wrecked ("lunched the transmission")
Mag
magnesium wheel, or steel or aluminum copy resembling one such
magneto
Merc — Mercury
Mill — any internal combustion engine
Moons (or Moon discs; incorrectly, moon discs) — plain flat chrome or aluminum disc hubcaps, originally adopted by land speed racers. Smaller examples are "baby Moons". Named for Dean Moon.
Mopar — any car or engine sold by Chrysler Corporation; from the name of the parts, service, and customer care organization 
Mouse — small-block Chevy
Mountain motor — large-displacement engine. Named for their size, and for being constructed in the mountains of Tennessee and North Carolina. In organized automotive competition, the term commonly references a V8 engine displacing more than 500 cubic inches; informally, a V8 engine displacing more than 560 cubic inches
The move — giving someone in a drag race the option to move first. Also "the hit"
Nail — any car used as a daily driver
Nailhead — Early Buick V8, named for relatively small diameter valves
Nerf bar — a small tubular or solid T-shaped or decorative bar that acts as a bumper.
Nitro — Nitromethane, used as a fuel additive in some drag cars
Nitrous — nitrous oxide
NOS
New Old Stock, stockpiled parts of models no longer produced, not previously available for retail purchase. (More common among customizers than rodders.)
Nitrous Oxide System (a.k.a. laughing gas, liquid supercharger, nitrous, "the bottle"): apparatus for introducing nitrous oxide into the air intake of an engine prior to the fuel entering the cylinder.
Nosed — as in "nosed & decked": removal of any hood (bonnet) or trunk (boot) ornaments, the filling of holes, and painting as a smooth clean surface.
Pickoupe — car-based light-duty pickup, blend of "pickup" & "coupé"
Pinched — narrowed and lengthened body, usually at the nose
Pop
a mixture of nitro & alky
British slang for a sit-up and beg Ford Popular.
Plod
(British) body filler
(British) traffic police (after PC Plod in Enid Blyton's Noddy series)
Poncho - Pontiac product
Ported and polished — enlarging and smoothing of the intake and exhaust port surfaces of performance engine cylinder heads to facilitate the ease of movement and increased volume of the engine gases.
Port-matching — the lining up of the intake manifold, cylinder head ports and exhaust headers as to create one continuous smooth course of travel for engine gases with no ledges or obstructions.
Prepped — a track or road that has been treated with various chemicals to increase traction
Pro Street — street-legal car resembling a Pro Stock car. Some are very thinly disguised racers.
Puke can — radiator overflow reservoir, to prevent boilovers spilling on the track
QJ — Quadrajet (Rochester 4-barrel carburetor)
Q-jet — Quadrajet
Ragtop - convertible or roadster
Rail
dragster with exposed front frame rails. Usually refers to early short-wheelbase cars, and not usually to Altereds.
(drag racing) guardrail
Rail job 
dragster with exposed front frame. Usually refers to early short-wheelbase cars, and not usually to Altereds.
Rat 
Chevy big block engine,
rat rod
Redline — maximum safe rev limit; to operate an engine at that limit ("redline it", "redlined it")
Repop - reproduction (part)
Rockcrusher — Muncie M22 4-speed transmission so-called because of the audible differences in operation between the model M-22 and its lower strength but quieter cousin, the M-21
Rocket — Oldsmobile, in particular their early V8s
Rolled pan (sometimes roll pan) — a contoured sheet of metal covering the space where the bumper used to be
Sandbagger — driver who intentionally drives slower than his car is capable of or lets off before the end of the drag strip to give the illusion his car is slower than it is to lure people into racing.
SBC — small-block Chevy V8
SBF — Small block Ford V8.
Sectioned — having sectioning ("the '49 was sectioned"); having performed a sectioning ("he sectioned the Merc")
Sectioning — removing of a horizontal center section of the body and reattaching the upper and lower parts
Shoebox — '49-'54 Ford (for the slab-sided appearance)
Shotgun - Ford Boss 429
Six Pak   - Chrysler carburetor arrangement with three two-barrels
SkyJackers — air shocks used in the rear to jack up the backend to clear wider tires/wheels.
Slammed — lowering the car very close to the ground. Frequently accomplished with the use of air suspension.
Sleeper — a car built to appear stock or in poor condition but actually very quick.
Slick(s) — soft compound tire with no grooves, designed only for drag racing. Usually much wider than normal street tires.
Slingshot — later variety of early digger, named for the driver's position behind the rear wheels (not its speed)
Slug
piston
slow car
Slushbox - automatic transmission
Smack — Nitrous Oxide
Small tire — a drag racing car using rear tires generally no taller than 29" and no wider than 10.5" 
SOHC ("sock") - 427 “cammer”
Souped (or "souped up") — hopped up, performance improved (more common in '40s and '50s)
Spray — nitrous oxide
Snail — turbocharger, from the snail shell appearance of the housing
Static — the use of static suspension components, such as coilovers, to lower a car
Steelies — stock steel rims
Stovebolt — Chevrolet Stovebolt engine
Straight axle — term for a car (often a gasser) that has had it stock A-arm style front suspension removed for leaf springs and a solid tube axle.
Street legal — dual-purpose car, capable of performing routine duties as well as weekend racing. Some cars described as such, such as Pro Street cars, are very thinly disguised racers.
Street-strip — dual-purpose car, capable of performing routine duties as well as weekend racing. Some cars described as such have very marginal off-track utility.
Strip
drag strip.
(more broadly) cars or parts used or intended for racing only. Thus "street-strip" is a dual-purpose car.
Stroke — Engine stroke; to increase the engine stroke ("stroke it")
Stroked — increased stroke, to increase displacement, by adding a longer-stroke crankshaft
Suicided — door changed from front- to rear-hinged ("suicide") type
Tin Indian — Pontiac (for the grille badge)
Toploader — Ford 4-speed manual transmission, so named because access to the transmission internal was made via an access panel located on the top of the transmission housing 
Track T — Model T roadster built in the style of a dirt track race car
Traction bars —usually, a set of square tubes attached to the back axle via 2 U bolts before and after the axle housing leading forward with a rubber snubber at the top end allowing as the car takes off to limit axle wrap on leaf springs.
Trailer queen - a race car that is not daily driven, is trailered to events, and sees little or no use other than on a race track
Tri-Five - a 1955, 1956 or 1957 Chevrolet automobile.
Tubbed — a car that has had its stock rear wheel wells removed and replaced with larger ones to allow for wider rear tires.
Tunneled — deeply sunken into fender
Virgin road — a stretch of road that has not been raced on or had traction increasing products used on it
Vdub — slang for a Volkswagen automobile.
Weedburners — short exhaust pipes, running parallel to the ground, with no mufflers (similar to Funny Car exhausts), used for racing, or just for show (not street legal)
Wheelie bars - rear-mounted bars with small wheels, designed to limit or eliminate wheelstands
Wombat — General Motors W series engine
Wrinkle walls — drag racing slicks
Zoomie pipes (or zoomies) — short exhaust pipes with no mufflers, used for racing, or just for show (not street legal)
Some terms have an additional, different meaning among customizers than among rodders: NOS, for instance, is a reference to new old stock, rather than nitrous oxide.

Gallery

See also 

 Automotive restoration
 Custom car
 Cutdown
 Flame job
 Hot hatch
 Import scene
 Kustom
 Lead sled
 Lowrider
 Muscle car
 Plymouth Prowler - a modern take on the hot rod
 Pro Street
 Rat rod
 Stock car
 Three window coupe - one of the classic styles
 Tuner
 Volksrod
 Crate engine

References

External links 
 List of Hot rod (www.historicvehicle.org)
 Automotive Museum (www.petersen.org)

Modified vehicles
Kustom Kulture
Visual arts media
Car culture
Youth culture in the United States